Karlstads-Tidningen (KT) (meaning "The Karlstad-Newspaper" in English) is a liberal newspaper which is released in Karlstad, Sweden.

History and profile
The newspaper was first published on 15 November 1879, then called Karlstads Tidning. During the Spanish Civil War, Karin Kajsa Rothman was a frequent contributor with news from the front lines.

In 2001 Karlstads-Tidningen was bought up by Värmlands Folkblad (VF).

Karlstads-Tidningen has a liberal political leaning.

References

External links
Official website

1879 establishments in Sweden
Newspapers established in 1879
Newspapers published in Sweden
Swedish-language newspapers
Värmland
Mass media in Karlstad